Gérard Clément-Brun (11 September 1865, in Avignon – 11 March 1920, in Avignon) was a French portrait and cityscape painter. Some sources give his year of birth as 1867 or 1868.

Biography 
He began his studies at the École des Beaux-Arts d'Avignon, under the tutelage of Pierre Grivolas, who advised him to study in Paris. There, he enrolled at the École des Beaux-Arts, where he studied with  William Bouguereau and Tony Robert-Fleury. Later, he entered the Académie Julian, where his instructors were Gabriel Ferrier and Jules Joseph Lefebvre

They held their first exhibit in 1912 at the Hôtel de Ville d'Avignon (City Hall)

In 1913, he obtained a silver medal at the Salon with his painting Le Raccommodeur de faïence (The Earthenware Mender)

A large collection of his works may be seen at the Musée Calvet in Avignon.

References

Further reading 
 André Alauzen and Laurent Noet; Dictionnaire des peintres et sculpteurs de Provence-Alpes-Côte d'Azur, Jeanne Laffitte, 2006 
 Raphaël Mérindol, "La vie et l'œuvre de Clément Brun", In: Revue Avignon, Rhône et Comtat, #3, June 1986, pp. 39–54

External links 

 Clément Brun @ Artistes provençaux

1865 births
1920 deaths
19th-century French painters
French portrait painters
Cityscape artists
Académie Julian
Artists from Avignon
20th-century French painters